This list of museums in Kansas is a list of museums, defined for this context as institutions (including nonprofit organizations, government entities, and private businesses) that collect and care for objects of cultural, artistic, scientific, or historical interest and make their collections or related exhibits available for public viewing. Also included are non-profit and university art galleries. Museums that exist only in cyberspace (i.e., virtual museums) are not included.

Museums

Defunct museums
 Abilene Fashion Museum
 Crawford County Historical Museum, Pittsburg, closed in 2015
 Lebold Mansion, Abilene, a private house as of 2010
 Museum of the Antique Fan Collectors Association, collection of electric fans, moving from Andover, Kansas to Zionsville, Indiana, website
 Norman No. 1 Oil Well Museum, Neodesha
 Scotty's Classic Car Museum, Arma, website, closed and for sale as of 3/3/2016
 Ted's Old Iron Farm and Museum, Columbus, closed in 2014 after owner's death

See also
 Botanical gardens in Kansas (category)
 List of museums in the United States
 Nature Centers in Kansas

References

Resources
Travel Kansas
Kansas Heritage Tours
Kansas Travel - descriptions & photos of museums and sights in Kansas
Kansas Museums Association

Kansas

Museums
Museums